Colin Knowlton Seymour-Ure (11 November 1938 – 18 November 2017) was professor of government at the University of Kent at Canterbury. He was a specialist in the history of political cartoons and caricature and was one of the founders of the British Cartoon Archive.

Selected publications
 David Low
 The Political Impact Of Mass Media
 Prime Ministers and the Media: Issues of Power and Control
 The British Press and Broadcasting Since 1945 
 The American President: Power and Communication

References

1938 births
2017 deaths
Academics of the University of Kent
People from Barnes, London
People educated at Tonbridge School
Alumni of Magdalen College, Oxford
Carleton University alumni
Alumni of Nuffield College, Oxford